Agua Grande 
May refer to:
 Agua Grande Lagoon in Sinaloa, Mexico
 Água Grande District on São Tomé Island in São Tomé and Príncipe